Dominik Distelberger (born 16 March 1990) is an Austrian athlete competing in the decathlon. He represented his country at the 2016 Summer Olympics finishing 19th.

International competitions

Personal bests
Outdoor
100 metres – 10.54 (+1.6 m/s, Ostrava 2011)
200 metres – 21.41 (-0.3 m/s, Villach 2010)
400 metres – 47.25 (Götzis 2010)
1000 metres – 2:56.28 (Ostrava 2007)
1500 metres – 4:27.10 (Ratingen 2010)
110 metres hurdles – 14.19 (+0.3 m/s, Paris 2017)
High jump – 2.00 (Götzis 2014)
Pole vault – 5.00 (Götzis 2016)
Long jump – 7.74 (+1.0 m/s, Villach 2010)
Shot put – 13.76 (Götzis 2016)
Discus throw – 45.23 (Schwechat-Rannersdorf 2015)
Javelin throw – 61.83 (Rio de Janeiro 2016)
Decathlon – 8175 (Götzis 2016)
Indoor
60 metres – 6.83 (Vienna 2010)
1000 metres – 2:41.01 (Tallinn 2011)
60 metres hurdles – 7.80 (Belgrade 2017)
High jump – 2.02 (Vienna 2010)
Pole vault – 5.10 (Belgrade 2017)
Long jump – 7.52 (Vienna 2013)
Shot put – 13.70 (Vienna 2016)
Heptathlon – 6063 (Belgrade 2017)

References

Austrian decathletes
Living people
1990 births
People from Scheibbs District
Athletes (track and field) at the 2015 European Games
European Games gold medalists for Austria
European Games medalists in athletics
Athletes (track and field) at the 2016 Summer Olympics
Olympic athletes of Austria
Sportspeople from Lower Austria